The 9th Minnesota Infantry Regiment was a Minnesota USV infantry regiment that served in the Union Army in the Western Theater of the American Civil War.

Service
The 9th Minnesota Infantry Regiment was organized into service at Camp Release, Hutchinson, Glencoe, Fort Ridgely, Fort Snelling and St. Peter, Minnesota, between August 15 and October 31, 1862.   The companies were individually mustered into Federal service at Camp Release in October.
 A Co. Joined the 6th Minnesota on August 25 to relieve besieged Fort Ridgely.  A company saw action against the Sioux at the Battle of Birch Coulee and the Battle of Wood Lake.  They mustered into Federal service on October 2. They saw action again at the Big Mound, Buffalo Lake and the Battle of Stony Lake. 
 B Co. saw action at Glencoe on 3 September and defended Hutchinson 3-4  September 1862. 
 C Co. joined Sibley's forces at New Ulm and saw action at Wood Lake.  Mustered into Federal service on 5 October. 
 D, E, and H companies were the guard at the hangings of the 38 Sioux in Mankato.  
 F Co. was organized at Fort Snelling and posted to Fort Ridgely for a year.  Was mustered in Federal service in September 1862.
 G Co. was organized at St. Cloud and posted north at Fort Abercrombie for a year. 
 I Co. was at Glencoe, St. Peter, and Fort Ridgely until 1863.  Mustered in Federal service on 12 October. 
 K Co. was organized at Fort Snelling and posted to South Bend outside Mankato and then to New Ulm and Madelia. 

In September 1863 the regiment was reorganized as a unit and sent south to St. Louis Missouri, where it was posted to the Department of Missouri.   May 1864 the 9th Minnesota was attached to the 2nd Brigade, 1st Division, 16th Army Corps, Dept. of the Tennessee, to December 1864.  At that time they were made part of the 2nd Brigade, 1st Division (Detachment), Army of the Tennessee, Dept. of the Cumberland.  From February, until August 1865. the regiment was part of the 2nd Brigade, 1st Division, 16th Army Corps (New), Military Division West Mississippi. 

In August the was sent back to St. Paul for discharge.

Casualties
The 9th Minnesota Infantry suffered 6 officers and 41 enlisted men killed in action or who later died of their wounds, plus another 3 officers and 224 enlisted men who died of disease, for a total of 274 fatalities.

Colonels
Colonel Alexander Wilkin – August 24, 1862, to July 14, 1864.
Colonel Josiah F. Marsh – July 27, 1864, to August 19, 1865.

References

External links
 The Civil War Archive
 Minnesota Historical Society page on Minnesota and the Civil War
 MNopedia article about the 9th Minnesota

Notes

See also
List of Minnesota Civil War Units
10th Minnesota Infantry Regiment

Units and formations of the Union Army from Minnesota
1862 establishments in Minnesota
Military units and formations established in 1862
Military units and formations disestablished in 1865